Duruma is a settlement in Kenya's Kwale County.

Duruma is the local dialect of Mijikenda language.

References 

Populated places in Coast Province
Kwale County